Medan Polonia  is one of 21 administrative districts (kecamatan) in the city of Medan, North Sumatra, Indonesia. The old Polonia Airport was located in this district. This area consists of luxury housing and restaurants near the airport, and shops and  houses on the north side.

Boundaries of the district (Indonesian: kecamatan):
 To the north : Medan Petisah
 To the south : Medan Johor
 To the east  : Medan Maimun
 To the west  : Medan Baru

At the 2010 Census, it had a population of 52,794 inhabitants.

Interesting places 
 Sri Mariamman Temple (ஸ்ரீ மாரியம்மன் கோவில்), Hindu temple
 Kampung Madras (மதராஸ் கிராமம்), Little India
 Sun Plaza, Shopping Mall
 Hermes Place Polonia, Shopping Mall
 Vihara Gunung Timur (東嶽觀), Buddhist temple
 Masjid Agung (مسجد اڬوڠ), Mosque
 Gurdwara Sri Guru Arjun Dev Ji (ਗੁਰਦੁਆਰਾ ਸ੍ਰੀ ਗੁਰੂ ਅਰਜਨ ਦੇਵ ਜੀ), Sikhs Gurdwara

References 

Medan